

Peerage of England

|Earl of Northampton (1080)||Simon II de Senlis, Earl of Huntingdon-Northampton||1109||1153|| 
|-
|rowspan=2|Earl of Surrey (1088)||William de Warenne, 2nd Earl of Surrey||1099||1138||Died
|-
|William de Warenne, 3rd Earl of Surrey||1138||1148|| 
|-
|Earl of Warwick (1088)||Roger de Beaumont, 2nd Earl of Warwick||1119||1153|| 
|-
|Earl of Buckingham (1097)||Walter Giffard, 2nd Earl of Buckingham||1102||1164|| 
|-
|Earl of Leicester (1107)||Robert de Beaumont, 2nd Earl of Leicester||1118||1168|| 
|-
|Earl of Chester (1121)||Ranulf de Gernon, 4th Earl of Chester||1129||1153|| 
|-
|Earl of Gloucester (1121)||Robert, 1st Earl of Gloucester||1121||1147|| 
|-
|rowspan=2|Earl of Hertford (1135)||Richard Fitz Gilbert de Clare||1135||1136||New creation; Died
|-
|Gilbert de Clare, 1st Earl of Hertford||1136||1151|| 
|-
|Earl of Richmond (1136)||Alan de Bretagne, 1st Earl of Richmond||1136||1146||New creation
|-
|Earl of Arundel (1138)||William d'Aubigny, 1st Earl of Arundel||1138||1176||New creation
|-
|Earl of Bedford (1138)||Hugh de Beaumont, 1st Earl of Bedford||1138||1142||New creation
|-
|rowspan=2|Earl of Derby (1138)||Robert de Ferrers, 1st Earl of Derby||1138||1139||New creation; Died
|-
|Robert de Ferrers, 2nd Earl of Derby||1139||1162|| 
|-
|Earl of Pembroke (1138)||Gilbert de Clare, 1st Earl of Pembroke||1138||1147||New creation
|-
|Earl of Worcester (1138)||Waleran de Beaumont, 1st Earl of Worcester||1138||1145||New creation
|-
|Earl of Essex (1139)||Geoffrey de Mandeville, 1st Earl of Essex||1139||1144||New creation

Peerage of Scotland

|Earl of Mar (1114)||Ruadrí, Earl of Mar||1115||Abt. 1140||
|-
|rowspan=2|Earl of Dunbar (1115)||Gospatric II, Earl of Dunbar||1115||1138||Died
|-
|Gospatric III, Earl of Dunbar||1138||1166||
|-
|rowspan=2|Earl of Angus (1115)||Dufugan, Earl of Angus||1115||1135||Died
|-
|Gille Brigte, Earl of Angus||1135||1187||
|-
|Earl of Atholl (1115)||Máel Muire, Earl of Atholl||1115||Abt 1150||
|-
|rowspan=2|Earl of Buchan (1115)||Gartnait, Earl of Buchan||1115||Abt. 1135||Died
|-
|Colbán, Earl of Buchan||Abt. 1135||Abt. 1180||
|-
|Earl of Strathearn (1115)||Máel Ísu I, Earl of Strathearn||1115||Abt. 1140||
|-
|rowspan=2|Earl of Fife (1129)||Gille Míchéil, Earl of Fife||1129||1139||Died
|-
|Donnchad I, Earl of Fife||1139||1154||
|-
|}

References

 

Lists of peers by decade
1130s in England
12th century in Scotland
12th-century English nobility
12th-century mormaers
Peers